Tidarren sisyphoides is a spider of the family Theridiidae (tangle web spiders).

The male of this species is only ~1% the size of the female. At copulation, the male dies during insertion and remains attached to the female for more than two hours. However, the female does not eat her mate. The dead male is afterwards removed from the web.

Etymology
From Sisyphos, a king in Greek mythology.

Distribution
Tidarren sisyphoides occurs from the southern United States to Colombia and on the West Indies.

References

 B. Knoflach, S. P. Benjamin, 2003: Mating without Sexual Cannibalism in Tidarren sisyphoides (Araneae, Theridiidae). Journal of Arachnology 31:445-448 (PDF)

External links

Theridiidae
Spiders of North America
Spiders described in 1842